Marian Fuks could refer to:
 Marian Fuks (photographer) (1884–1935), Polish filmmaker and pioneer of photography
 Marian Fuks (historian) (1914–2022), Polish historian